Field hockey, for the 2013 Bolivarian Games, took place from 23 November to 30 November 2013.

Medal summary

Medalists

Medal table

Men's tournament

Round-robin

Classification round

Fifth and sixth place

Bronze medal match

Gold medal match

Final standings

Women's tournament

Pool

Fixtures

References

Events at the 2013 Bolivarian Games
Bolivarian Games
Bolivarian Games
2013 Bolivarian Games